I'm Like a Virgin Losing a Child is the debut studio album from Atlanta alternative rock band Manchester Orchestra. It was released via Favorite Gentlemen/ Canvasback Recordings on October 14, 2006.

The song "Wolves at Night" is featured in the video game NHL 08.

Track listing

Personnel

Manchester Orchestra 

 Andy Hull - lyrics, vocals, guitar, keyboards
 Chris Freeman - percussion, keyboards
 Jonathan Corley - bass
 Jeremiah Edmond - drums, percussion
 Robert McDowell - guitar, intern

Additional Personnel 

 Andy Lee - guitar on 'The Neighborhood is Bleeding'
 Dan Hannon - producer, mixing, guitar
 Glenn Schick - mastering
 Jordan Noel - artwork

References

2006 debut albums
Manchester Orchestra albums